The South African Railways Class 16DA 4-6-2 of 1930 was a steam locomotive.

In 1930, the South African Railways placed six redesigned Class 16DA steam locomotives with a 4-6-2 Pacific type wheel arrangement in passenger train service.

Manufacturer

An order for six locomotives for the South African Railways (SAR), similar to the Class 16DA Pacific type locomotives of 1928 and 1929 but built to an improved design, was placed with Henschel and Son of Kassel in Germany in 1930.

Characteristics

In an attempt to improve the steaming properties of further orders of Class 16DA locomotives, A.G. Watson, who had succeeded Colonel Collins as CME in 1929, designed a boiler of the Wootten type. Watson was a firm believer in large firegrates with enlarged blast pipe caps to give a reasonably low burning rate of fuel per unit of grate area, which improved boiler efficiency and reduced the emission of sparks and partially burnt fuel.

The boiler itself was of the same dimensions as that of the earlier locomotives in terms of girth and length between tube plates, the only difference being in the tube arrangement. It was of comparable proportions to those which would later be installed on the Class 15E and Class 23.

This boiler and firebox was installed on these final six Class 16DA locomotives, numbered in the range from 874 to 879, which were built by Henschel and delivered in 1930. Compared to the earlier Hohenzollern- and Baldwin-built locomotives, the steaming ability of the six Henschel-built locomotives was phenomenal and led to the adoption of wide fireboxes without combustion chambers as the standard on all subsequent SAR mainline steam locomotives.

The Henschel-built Class 16DA locomotives with their much wider fireboxes, their correspondingly larger grate areas and slightly larger diameter trailing wheels were sufficiently different from the Baldwin- and Hohenzollern-builts to justify a separate classification such as Class 16DB, but this did not happen and the locomotives ended up being known as the Wide Firebox or Boepens Class 16DA.

Modifications
Five of these locomotives were delivered with Walschaerts valve gear. The last engine, no. 879, was built with Caprotti valve gear for experimental purposes. This rotary poppet valve gear was driven from a single gearbox on the centre of the driving axle. The valve gear was given a fair trial, but was eventually replaced with the standard Walschaerts valve gear in 1940.

Four of them were later retyred with  diameter tyres on their coupled wheels.

When the larger tyres were fitted, the old tyres were left in position and turned down on the wheel centres to serve as liners and the new tyres were then shrunk on over the liners. The practice of increasing the diameter of coupled wheels, wheel spacing and other considerations permitting, was begun by A.G. Watson during his term in office and was continued by his successors. The reduction of tractive effort caused by the larger wheels was made up by increasing boiler pressures or by fitting larger cylinders or both, as required. This policy resulted in more mileage between heavy repairs, less cost-per-mile on repairs and locomotives capable of higher speeds.

Service
The locomotives were placed in service at Kimberley and took over the working of the Union Limited and Union Express between there and Johannesburg from the narrow firebox Class 16DA. They were never stationed at Braamfontein Loco in Johannesburg, but were serviced there in the process of working between Kimberley and Johannesburg. They also worked south from Kimberley to Beaufort West.

When the Class 16E arrived in 1935, these Class 16DAs remained in service on the express trains in company with the new locomotives which were also stationed at
Kimberley and also worked north to Johannesburg and south to Beaufort West.

In 1939–1940, when new air-conditioned rolling stock was placed in service on the Union Limited and Union Express services between Cape Town and Johannesburg, all the Class 16DA and Class 16E locomotives were transferred to Bloemfontein in the Free State. From here, they continued to work passenger trains north and south, including the Orange Express which was the premier passenger train passing through Bloemfontein. During the 1950s the Orange Express was worked almost exclusively by wide firebox Class 16DA and Class 16E locomotives between Bloemfontein and Kimberley. When the Class 15F replaced them, they were relegated to suburban and local passenger train work. The wide firebox Class 16DA were withdrawn from service in 1973.

Preservation

Works numbers
The table lists the Class 16DA engine numbers, works numbers and variations in coupled wheel sizes.

Illustration

References

1940
1940
4-6-2 locomotives
2′C1′ h2 locomotives
Henschel locomotives
Cape gauge railway locomotives
Railway locomotives introduced in 1930
1930 in South Africa